Railroads in Honduras were built in late 19th and early 20th centuries by two competing U.S. corporations - United Fruit (Tela Railroad Company) and Standard Fruit (later nationalized). All were in the Caribbean coastal area and never reached the capital. In 1993, the combined network had 785 km. At present (2006), only three separate segments remain in operation under the management of FNH - Ferrocarril Nacional de Honduras:
 San Pedro Sula - Puerto Cortes (50 km, freight trains carrying mainly lumber)
 City rail in La Ceiba (3 km, passenger transport between downtown and a western suburb, Col. Sitramacsa)
 Line between La Unión (a village near La Ceiba) and Parque Nacional Cuero y Salado (9 km, transport of coconuts to a processing plant and of tourists to national park)
 In late 2010, a commuter/tourist train was established in San Pedro Sula.

History 

In the 19th century From the middle of the 19th century, the rulers of the newly formed State of Honduras were considering the realization of a railway project that would be transportation for the government and the population.On June 23, 1853, when General José Trinidad Cabañas was president, he signed the first contract for the construction of a railroad that would cross Honduras from North to South. And what would be worth for the use of ports between the Gulf of Fonseca in the Pacific Ocean and the coasts of the Caribbean Sea, in turn the transport of goods, such as migrants. The idea was put on the table for conversations. An American construction company was hired to carry out the work; but, a coup d'état perpetrated by General Juan López Aguirre, which would remove President Cabañas from the administration frustrated both the idea and its continuity. Later, with the country already being a republic, in 1868 and under the presidency of General José María Medina, this attempt to continue with the national inter-oceanic railway project which would follow the following route. "It would start in Puerto Caballos (Puerto Cortés) and after crossing the Llano de Sula (Sula Valley) and crossing the Ulúa River, at the height of the town of Santiago, it would continue along the banks of the Humuya River and would reach the valley of Comayagua passing through the colonial city and capital of the nation and would continue south along the banks of the Goascorán River to conclude in the Gulf of Fonseca ". For such an adventure, Medina contacted the plenipotentiary ambassador of Honduras in Europe, Attorney Carlos Gutiérrez who, together with the French-born Mr. Jean Víctor Herrán Note 3, moved to England to hold talks with the English kingdom and thus finance the work through a loan.

The idea was similar, to build the railways between Puerto Cortés and the Gulf of Fonseca. In 1867 the Honduran representatives were successful in contracting four loans: The first two were from the Bischoffsheim House and the Goldschmidt House located in the city of London, which agreed to deliver four million pounds sterling, with 10% of interest. On February 20, 1868, President José María Medina signed the government decree for the construction of the railway and for this he contracted the American businessman William Mcandlish and company for said work and to whom the diplomat Carlos Gutiérrez claimed to have delivered fifty thousand pounds sterling on date 10 November 1868, that is why on January 18, 1869, the engineer Enrique O'Hagans would arrive in Omoa to carry out the operations of territorial study, location of equipment, relocation of houses, etc. In the month of December of the same year, three ships left the English shores containing materials and rails. Supposedly in 1869 in France the Parisian houses: Dreyfus, Scheyer and Company, gave the rest of the money loaned by the government of Honduras. Although, of all that money, the government coffers only received only 300,000 British Pounds, since the European bankers saw a way to collect the interest of a good payer, in the same way other money was used to pay the diplomatic representatives.At the end of it all, the national territory was submerged in a civil war and with only one section of the railway built and in January 1870, the acting Minister of Foreign Affairs, Mr. Francisco Alvarado, had reported that the section would be completed by November of the year. in progress, but it did not count on the construction of a bridge over the lagoon and thus connect the pier with the section, which delayed the delivery that would not be effective until April 16, 1870. Then on July 20, the American James C. Madeley, gave a report on the progress of the works and mentioned that forty-five miles of forest had been cleared for the section, the completion of the Choloma bridge and the Río Blanco bridge that concluded on July 23; Likewise, eight miles of rails have been placed and on which a small manual locomotive already travels, there are cuttings around twenty-nine thousand sleepers and that two ships carrying two locomotives and material for the iron bridge that were being built would dock in the port. on the Chamelecón River and for the section that would cross San Pedro Sula.

On July 30, 1870, the engineer James Bryson informed the government of President José María Medina that the two locomotives had disembarked and were ready to be mounted on the rails and put to the test, they were called “Medina”. In the same month and year, in San Pedro Sula the “Medina” locomotive was circulating along with a “first class” car and other wagons, by December 1870 the locomotives (three in total) were working at full steam spanning Puerto Cortés, San Pedro Sula, Potrerillos and Villa Medina.

Debt scandal 
Under the presidency always of Captain General José María Medina, the creation and circulation of a new official currency in Honduras was given by decree, the Honduran peso of nickel material due to its low esteem within the economic market, this was devalued and the creditors of the borrowing houses so much from France that at first they agreed, it turned against them since the government of Honduras could not pay. The English accountant Robert Watts in a meeting suggested on August 3, 1875, to protect the English bonds and guarantee the payment of the debt and its interests; For this, the Honduran territory had to be sold or leased, to its most probable buyer, the United States of America, and thus the bank creditors would compensate their investment.

This reached the Courts of Justice of France, where the magistrates would condemn the House of Dreyfus for the crime of Improper Handling of Loans. Honduras was governed by Doctor Marco Aurelio Soto who on November 8, 1876, decided to suppress the London legation under Gutiérrez, as well as that of Paris in the hands of Víctor Herrán; For this, the inheritance of this debt would also be carried by his successors and the Railroad operated normally despite only having 100 kilometers. In 1878, President Soto empowered General Luis Bográn to travel to Europe to gather the necessary information and carry out an exhaustive investigation and face the responsibilities for all the speculations carried out with the funds derived from the contracted loans, which led to the following year A decree was issued calling those responsible for such loans to account.

The Decree established as a procedure the integration of a special committee, so that in the month of August of the same year, Adolfo Zuñiga, Carlos Ernesto Bernhard and Miguel A. Lardizabal, Mr. Policarpo Bonilla and Mr. Julio Lozano were appointed in secretary quality. However, Messrs. Herrán and Gutiérrez did not appear to make statements and the investigation was stalled.

Banana republic 

Starting in the 20th century, The Vaccaro Brothers Company or "Los Hermanos Vaccaro", was a family of Italian origin who traded bananas in New Orleans. This company received land concessions on the north coast of Honduras. In return, concessionaires had to build rail lines over a large area. The lands were granted according to the number of kilometers of railroad that each company built, establishing, for example, 250 hectares for each kilometer of railway. The Vaccaro Brothers Company, as other concessionaires on the north coast did later, took advantage of the privileges granted by the concessions to export bananas from the port city of La Ceiba.

The 785 km of railways were originally built by the banana companies and consist of two separate systems with different gauges. The largest system, with almost 600 kilometers of track, was built by the Standard Fruit Company. Subsequently, it was decided to request a loan between the government and the Sula Agricultural Company for the amount of One million dollars (US$1 million) to repair, build new sections and acquire new equipment, due to this the Cuyamel Fruit Company subsidiary of The Tela Railroad Company would benefit by accepting a transfer made by the Sula Agricultural Company and thus by Government Decree No. 4 dated April 17, 1920, the Cuyamel Fruit Co. would go on to administer the National Railroad, which would once again be of the government since 1983.

Previously on February 24, 1920, the Honduran government granted a concession for the Construction and maintenance and exploitation of the railway in the Department of Colón, between the same and the company represented by Mr. William N. Zuber in favor of Carmelo D´Antoni and published in La Gaceta No. 5318.

Honduran national railroad 
The railway was first equipped with 30 steam locomotives, and among others with more than 600 cars to transport bananas and other freights, 22 cars to transport passengers, 13 tank cars to transport oil and molasses, 59 ballasts and 45 railcars.

By 1930, more than thirteen steam locomotives, 16 wagons, 3 first-class cars, 2 second-class cars, 3 baggage cars, 2 cabooses, 2 tank cars, 61 banana transport cars, 12 platforms, 1 tram were acquired. urban, 2 carts to transport ice, 39 carts to transport cane and 2 camps. In the early 1960s all steam locomotives were replaced by diesel electric machines.6 Since 1952 there has been no real significant increase in rolling equipment endowments in any of the railway companies by the Honduran government. This entailed that all the acquired locomotives were donated and bought from foreign countries.

Although, thanks to the support of the private sector, they were able to acquire several diesel locomotives and rail buses.The national railway started from Puerto Cortés, crossed the Sula Valley and ended in Potrerillos, being an approximate distance of 95 kilometers and 10 stations. With branches to the town of El Progreso, La Lima and the port of Tela. In 2004 passenger trains were canceled, leaving only to transport cargo.In 1952, the significant increase in the provision of rolling stock in any of the railway companies by the Honduran government began to gradually stop, plus there was aid for the maintenance of the machines, which is why the national railway ended up being financed almost entirely by the Honduran government. private sector, which managed to keep it in good shape by providing an efficient public transport service until the 1990s, buying new machines such as changing steam locomotives to diesel and acquiring more rail buses that made trips from Puerto Cortes, passing through San Pedro Sula and Tela, one being of the Japanese brand Nippon Sharyo model 1967 which operated until the 2000s.

Transoceanic project 
In 2013 it was announced that the Honduran Government and the China Harbour Engineering Company (CCEC) were interested in building a transoceanic railroad. The governments of Honduras and the People's Republic of China plan to build a naval port on the island of Tigre in the Municipality of Amapala that would be the main one in unloading and loading of goods, which will be conducted by a new railway line, which would cross the departments of Valle, El Paraíso, Olancho and Colón, to the north coast, thus avoiding ships crossing the Panama Canal.

See also 
 Honduras
 Rail transport by country

References

External links 

 Unofficial timetables of Central American railroads
 Pictures from 2003, before suspension of passenger trains Puerto Cortés - Tela
 Overview of Honduras rail with contact addresses, pictures and external links
 More pictures from La Ceiba city rail (2005)

 
3 ft 6 in gauge railways in Honduras
3 ft gauge railways in Honduras